Leordina is a commune in Maramureș County, Maramureș, Romania. It is composed of a single village, Leordina.

Geography
Leordina is situated in the north-east of Maramureș County. The neighbouring localities are Petrova and Vișeu de Jos. The river Vișeu passes through Leordina.

Gallery

References

External links

Communes in Maramureș County
Localities in Romanian Maramureș